Diego Antonio Crosa Cuevas (born 21 October 2002) is a Mexican professional footballer who plays as a midfielder for Puebla.

Career statistics

Club

Notes

References

External links
 

2002 births
Living people
Mexican footballers
Association football midfielders
C.D. Veracruz footballers
Club Puebla players
Tlaxcala F.C. players
Liga de Expansión MX players
Footballers from Veracruz
People from Veracruz (city)
Tercera División de México players